Katha Nayagan is a 1988 Indian Tamil-language comedy film, directed by Muktha Srinivasan and produced by Ramaswamy Govind and Muktha S. Ravi. The film stars Pandiarajan, S. V. Sekhar, Rekha and Manorama. It is a remake of the Malayalam film Nadodikkattu.

Plot 

Friends Mani and Ramani are B.Com and SSLC graduates respectively. They have difficulties finding a job suited to their qualification. Even if they find a job, they are unable to sustain in their job for long due to their attitude. Due to their innocence, Mani and Ramani are often fooled by people. One man sells them a cow saying it will give them many litres of milk per day, but the cow ends up hardly giving them any milk. After such failed endeavours, they meet an agent, who promises them to take them to Dubai and give them a job there. They give all their money to the agent, and he tells them to get on a boat. But they are fooled because the boat goes to Kerala instead. In Kerala, a drug smuggling gang mistakes them for CID officers due to some hilarious misconceptions and funny incidents. How Mani and Ramani survive in Kerala, and at the same time, how they unintentionally cause the smuggling gang to get caught by the police, forms the rest of the story.

Cast 

Pandiarajan as Mani
S. V. Sekhar as Ramani
Rekha as Radha
Ramya Krishnan in a Guest Appearance
Manorama as Radha's mother
Kamala Kamesh as Mani's mother
S. S. Chandran as Kannayiram
Malaysia Vasudevan as Mamandu Maasilamani
Delhi Ganesh as Inspector of police
K. Natraj
Kumarimuthu as Annan Krishnan
Kallapetti Singaram as Konar
Kathadi Ramamurthy as Bank officer
Typist Gopu
Neelu as Head clark
Oru Viral Krishna Rao as cow buyer
Pradeep Shakthi as Mayil Ravanan
'Bayilvan' Renganathan
Nagarajachozhan
Kovai Anuradha
Pasi Narayanan as Gaja

Soundtrack 
The soundtrack consist of four songs composed by Chandrabose, with lyrics written by Vairamuthu. The song "Vaisakha Sandhye" from Nadodikattu was retained in Tamil as "Poo Poothathu".

Reception 
The Indian Express wrote, "The comedy line sometimes falters as it does when [Pandiarajan] keeps harping to the point of nausea on his educational attainment and his friend's lack of it".

References

External links 
 

1980s Tamil-language films
1988 films
Films directed by Muktha Srinivasan
Films scored by Chandrabose (composer)
Films with screenplays by Crazy Mohan
Indian comedy films
Tamil remakes of Malayalam films